Korean postpositions, or particles, are suffixes or short words in Korean grammar that immediately follow a noun or pronoun. This article uses the Revised Romanization of Korean to show pronunciation. The hangul versions in the official orthographic form are given underneath.

References

postpositions